The women's boulder competition in sport climbing at the 2017 World Games took place on 21 July 2017 at the Nowy Targ Square in Wrocław, Poland.

Competition format
A total of 11 athletes entered the competition. In qualification every athlete has to get on the top of 4 boulders. Top 6 climbers qualify to final.

Results

Qualifications

Final

References 

 
2017 World Games